Miguel Bruno Pereira Cardoso (born 8 December 1971) is a former Portuguese professional footballer.

Career statistics

Club

References

External links
 

1971 births
Living people
People from Ovar
Portuguese footballers
Portugal youth international footballers
Portugal under-21 international footballers
Association football forwards
C.D. Feirense players
FC Porto players
A.D. Ovarense players
F.C. Paços de Ferreira players
S.C. Beira-Mar players
C.F. Os Belenenses players
Gil Vicente F.C. players
S.C. Salgueiros players
Associação Académica de Coimbra – O.A.F. players
S.C. Espinho players
Varzim S.C. players
Segunda Divisão players
Liga Portugal 2 players
Primeira Liga players
Sportspeople from Aveiro District